Pearson Terrace is a historic rowhouse block in Indianapolis, Indiana. It was built in 1901–1902, and is a two-story, seven unit, vernacular Queen Anne style grey brick row with limestone trim. It sits on a raised basement and has a complex gable roof. It features a projecting two bay center unit and projecting window bay.

It was listed on the National Register of Historic Places in 1984. It is in the St. Joseph Neighborhood Historic District.

References

Individually listed contributing properties to historic districts on the National Register in Indiana
Houses on the National Register of Historic Places in Indiana
Queen Anne architecture in Indiana
Houses completed in 1902
Houses in Indianapolis
National Register of Historic Places in Indianapolis